Peter Nicastro (born December 9, 1998) is a professional Canadian football offensive lineman for the Toronto Argonauts of the Canadian Football League.

University career 
Nicastro played U Sports football for the Calgary Dinos football team. During his U Sports career, Nicrastro started at 20 games for the Dinos from 2017 to 2019, and won the Vanier Cup in 2019.

Professional career 
The Toronto Argonauts selected Nicastro with the seventh overall pick in the 2021 CFL Draft. He then signed with the team on May 18, 2021. He earned a starting position following training camp and played in his first professional game on August 7, 2021, against his hometown Calgary Stampeders at McMahon Stadium as the Argonauts' starting left guard.

References

External links 
 Toronto Argonauts bio

1998 births
Living people
Calgary Dinos football players
Canadian football offensive linemen
Players of Canadian football from Alberta
Canadian football people from Calgary
Toronto Argonauts players
University of Calgary alumni
Canadian Football League Rookie of the Year Award winners